The name Vera has been used for thirteen tropical cyclones in the northwest Pacific Ocean.

Tropical Storm Vera (1951) (T5118) – A minimal tropical storm that made landfall as a weakening depression in Vietnam.
Typhoon Vera (1956) (T5605)
Typhoon Vera (1959) (T5915, 39W) – Hit Japan and over 5,000 were killed.
Typhoon Vera (1962) (T6215, 60W) – Hit Japan.
Tropical Storm Vera (1965) (T6504, 05W, Daling)
Tropical Storm Vera (1967) (T6726, 30W)
Typhoon Vera (1971) (T7103, 03W, Karing)
Tropical Storm Vera (1973) (T7321, 23W, Openg)
Typhoon Vera (1977) (T7705, 07W)
Typhoon Vera (1979) (T7921, 24W, Yayang)
Typhoon Vera (1983) (T8303, 03W, Bebeng)
Typhoon Vera (1986) (T8613, 11W, Loleng)
Tropical Storm Vera (1989) (T8921, 24W, Pining)

The name Vera has also been used for one tropical cyclone in the southwestern Pacific Ocean.

Cyclone Vera (1974)

Pacific typhoon set index articles
Australian region cyclone set index articles